George W. Flynn (1938-January 8, 2020) was an American physical chemist and professor, known for his work 
in laser spectroscopy and scanning tunneling microscopy.

Early life and career
In 1938, Flynn was born and raised in Hartford, CT. Following the death of his father while he was still in high school, he was admitted to Yale University on a full scholarship. As an undergraduate he worked on research in the laboratory of Julian Sturtevant in the chemistry department at Yale. He received his bachelor's degree in 1960 and went to Harvard University to pursue a doctorate in chemistry. His thesis was supervised jointly by E. Bright Wilson, Jr. (in molecular spectroscopy) and John Baldeschwieler (in nuclear magnetic resonance spectroscopy). Follow the completion of his doctorate in 1964, he worked as a postdoctoral researcher at MIT in the physics department under Ali Javan. Together they developed, studied, and patented a new type of carbon dioxide gas laser. From there he joined the chemistry department at Columbia University in 1967 as an assistant professor, where he rose to the rank of Professor of Chemistry and Chemical Engineering, and was appointed as the Thomas Alva Edison Professor in 1986.

Important contributions
At Columbia, Flynn and his group developed new laser spectroscopy experiments to study the redistribution of quantum vibration energy within single molecules and the transfer of energy between colliding molecules. In a collaboration with Norman Sutin at Brookhaven National Laboratories, Flynn and Sutin developed laser-based methods for measuring the rates of reaction in solution. He also used scanning tunneling microscopy to study self-assembly of molecules at surfaces and other interfaces.

Awards and honors
Flynn received the Herbert P. Broida Prize in Chemical Physics (2003) of the American Physical Society, as well as the E. Bright Wilson Award in Spectroscopy and the Irving Langmuir Prize in Chemical Physics of the American Chemical Society. He was elected a fellow of the American Academy of Arts and Sciences (1997) and the National Academy of Sciences (2001).

Personal life
George Flynn married Jean Pieri, who holds a doctorate in nursing education, in 1970; they had two children together.

References

External links
 The Flynn Group at Columbia University

American chemists
Spectroscopists
1938 births
Yale College alumni
Harvard University alumni
Columbia University faculty
2020 deaths
Columbia Graduate School of Arts and Sciences alumni